The 80th Boat Race took place on 28 March 1928.  Held annually, the Boat Race is a side-by-side rowing race between crews from the Universities of Oxford and Cambridge along the River Thames. In a race umpired by former Oxford rower Charles Burnell, Cambridge won by ten lengths, the largest margin of victory since 1900, in a time of 20 minutes 25 seconds.  The victory took the overall record to 40–39 in Oxford's favour.

Background

The Boat Race is a side-by-side rowing competition between the University of Oxford (sometimes referred to as the "Dark Blues") and the University of Cambridge (sometimes referred to as the "Light Blues").  The race was first held in 1829, and since 1845 has taken place on the  Championship Course on the River Thames in southwest London.  The rivalry is a major point of honour between the two universities; it is followed throughout the United Kingdom and, as of 2014, broadcast worldwide.  Cambridge went into the race as reigning champions, having won the 1927 race by three lengths, with Oxford leading overall with 40 victories to Cambridge's 38 (excluding the "dead heat" of 1877).

Oxford were coached by H. R. Baker (who rowed for the Dark Blues in the 1908 and 1909 races), A. E. Kitchin (who also rowed in 1908), P. C. Mallam (a Dark Blue from 1921 to 1924 inclusive), C. M. Pitman (who rowed four times between 1892 and 1895) and J. D. W. Thomson (who was a three-time Blue between 1925 and 1927). Cambridge's coaches were  William Dudley Ward (who had rowed in 1897, 1899 and 1900 races), Francis Escombe, P. H. Thomas (a four-time Blue between 1902 and 1905) and David Alexander Wauchope (who had rowed in the 1895 race).  For the second year the umpire was Charles Burnell who had rowed for Oxford in the 1895, 1896, 1897 and 1898 races. Charles Kent, who rowed for Oxford in the 1891 race, was the finishing judge for the first time.

Crews
Cambridge's crew contained three participants with Boat Race experience:  R. Beesly, J. C. Holcroft and stroke T. E. Letchworth. Oxford saw four participants return, including number two T. W. Shaw and cox J. H. Croft, both of whom were making their third consecutive appearance in the event. One participant was registered as non-British:  Oxford's number four H. C. Morphett was from Australia.  

According to author and former Oxford rower George Drinkwater, the Cambridge crew were "really good" with the trial eights being "much above the average".  After relocating to Ely in the build-up to the race, Cambridge's crew was reorganised and improved, before final modifications were made at Putney.  Drinkwater stated "it was obvious that they were going to be a fast crew".  Conversely, Oxford suffered from "a dearth of experienced material" who "never developed and were quite incapable of rowing a racing stroke".

Race

Oxford won the toss and elected to start from the Middlesex station, handing the Surrey side of the river to Cambridge.  Burnell started the race at 9:45 a.m. in reasonable conditions but on a poor tide.  Cambridge took the lead from the start and were half a length ahead by the time they passed the boathouses ( along the course).  Dropping the stroke rate to 29 strokes per minute, the Light Blues held off the faster rating Oxford to the Mile Post.  Here Cambridge pushed away quickly and, according to Drinkwater, "long before Hammersmith the race had become a procession", so much so that the Light Blues reduced their efforts to a paddle.

Cambridge won by ten lengths in a time of 20 minutes 25 seconds, the slowest winning time since the 1925 race.  It was their fifth consecutive victory and their ninth win in ten races and took the overall record to 40–39 in Oxford's favour.  It was the largest winning margin where both boats completed the course since the 1900 race.

References
Notes

Bibliography

External links
 Official website

1928 in English sport
The Boat Race
March 1928 sports events
1928 in rowing
1928 sports events in London